or  is a lake in Karasjok Municipality in Troms og Finnmark county, Norway. The European route E06 highway crosses a bridge over the lake at the narrowest part of the lake.

See also
List of lakes in Norway

References

Karasjok
Lakes of Troms og Finnmark